The X Games Los Angeles 2013 was an action sporting event which took place from August 1–4, 2013 in Los Angeles, California, United States. Venues for the event included the Staples Center, Irwindale Event Center, and the streets near L.A. Live. It was the first year that events were held in Irwindale.

It was the fourth and last Summer X Games held in 2013, after events in Foz do Iguaçu, Brazil (April 18–21); Barcelona, Spain (May 9–12); and Munich, Germany (June 27–30).

It was the last year for Los Angeles to host the X Games, with Austin, Texas replacing the event in 2014.

Event locations

Venue locations for each sport disciplines for X Games Los Angeles:

Staples Center
Moto X Best Whip
Moto X Enduro X (Men’s & Women’s)
Moto X Freestyle
Moto X Racing (Men’s, Women’s & Adaptive)
Moto X Speed & Style
Moto X Step Up

Event Deck at L.A. Live
BMX Freestyle Street
Street League Skateboarding
Skateboard SLS Select Series
Skateboard Street Women’s
Skateboard Vert

Irwindale Event Center
Ford RallyCross
Ford Gymkhana GRID
GoPro BMX Freestyle Big Air
America’s Navy Skateboard Big Air

Results

Moto X

* Competition decided by fan voting via Twitter.

Skateboarding

BMX

Rallying

Medal table

References

External links
XGames.com

X Games in Los Angeles
2013 in American sports
2013 in rallying
2013 in multi-sport events
2013 in sports in California
2013 in Los Angeles